Hamza District is a district of the Al-Qādisiyyah Governorate, Iraq. Its seat is the city Hamza.

Districts of Muthanna Governorate